Saïd Belhout (born 16 April 1975) is an Algerian former long-distance runner who competed in the 2004 Summer Olympics. He was born in Tiaret.

References

1975 births
Living people
People from Tiaret
Algerian male middle-distance runners
Olympic athletes of Algeria
Athletes (track and field) at the 2004 Summer Olympics
Mediterranean Games gold medalists for Algeria
Athletes (track and field) at the 2005 Mediterranean Games
Mediterranean Games medalists in athletics
21st-century Algerian people